The  Chinese Professional Baseball League season began on March 16 when the defending champion Uni-President Lions played against the La New Bears in Tainan and concludes in October.

Regular season

Standings
First half

Second half

CPBL season
Chinese Professional Baseball League
Chinese Professional Baseball League seasons